Marie Régnier (Paris, 1840 July 11- Paris, 1887 March 18) was a French writer; a friend of Gustave Flaubert, she exchanged many letters with him.

She wrote under the penname of Daniel Darc.

Life 
Born Marie-Sidonie Serrure, she married in 1861 Raoul-Emmanuel Régnier, a doctor, and went to live with him at Mantes-la-Jolie; she came back to live in Paris in 1881.

She was a regular contributor to the daily newspaper Le Figaro.

Works 
 Une aventure d'hier (1870) (under the pen name Daniel Darcey) (Paul Ollendorff, 1885)
 Revanche posthume (1878)
 Les Rieuses (Comédie) (1878 [1886])
 La Princesse Méduse (Paris, 1880), with illustrations by Félix Régamey and his brother Frédéric Régamey

 Un duel de salon
 Les folies de Valentine (drama) (1880)
 Le Péché d'une vierge (1881)
 La couleuvre (1882)
 Petit Bréviaire du Parisien, dictionnaire humoristique (1883)
 Voilà le plaisir, Mesdames (Short stories) (1883)
 Voyage autour du bonheur (1884)
 Canifs et contrat (Short stories) (1884)
 Sagesse de poche, maximes et pensées
 Joyeuse Vie. Polygamie parisienne (1886).
 Les femmes inquiétantes et Les maris comiques. Suivis de Les anges du foyer, with illustrations by Godefroy  (1886)

References

Bibliography 
 Émile Gérard-Gailly, Flaubert et Daniel Darc (1934) (22p.) (second edition in Le grand amour de Flaubert (1944))

External links 
 Yvan Leclerc et Danielle Girard, Correspondance de Flaubert, Édition électronique -Régnier Marie

1840 births
1887 deaths
19th-century French dramatists and playwrights
19th-century French novelists
19th-century French women writers
French women novelists
Pseudonymous women writers
Writers from Paris
19th-century pseudonymous writers